Interlude may refer to:

a short play or, in general, any representation between parts of a larger stage production
Entr'acte, a piece of music performed between acts of a theatrical production
a section in a movement of a musical piece, see: Bridge or Break
a piece of music composed of one or more movements, to be inserted between sections of another composition: see also intermezzo, and for the Baroque era, sinfonia

Music

Albums
Interlude (Billy Taylor album), 1961
Interlude (Toshiko Akiyoshi album), 1987
Interlude (Kool Moe Dee album), 1994
Interlude (EP), a 1999 EP by Iron Savior
Interlude (Saint Etienne album), 2001
Interlude (David Lyttle album), 2012
Interlude (Delain album), 2013
Interlude (Jamie Cullum album), 2014

Songs
"Interlude" (aka "A Night in Tunisia"), a 1942 composition by Dizzy Gillespie
"Interlude" (1957 song), a Skinner/Webster song recorded by the McGuire Sisters in 1957
"Interlude" (Timi Yuro song), 1968, later covered by Morrissey and Siouxsie in 1994
a song by Cardiacs on the album A Little Man and a House and the Whole World Window, 1988
a hidden track by Blur on the album Blur, 1997
a song by Julie Ruin on the album Julie Ruin, 1998
a song by Leftöver Crack on the album Mediocre Generica, 2001
a song by Vanessa Carlton later renamed "A Thousand Miles", 2002
a song by Outkast on the album Speakerboxxx/The Love Below, 2003
an instrumental introduction to Muse's song "Hysteria" on the album Absolution, 2003
a song by My Chemical Romance on the album Three Cheers for Sweet Revenge, 2004
"An Interlude", a song by Atreyu on the album The Curse, 2004
a song by Laleh on the album Laleh, 2005
a song by All Time Low on the album The Party Scene, 2005
Two songs by DJ Kay Slay and Greg Street on the album The Champions: North Meets South, 2006: One featuring Shaquille O'Neal and the other Buffie the Body
a song by +44 on the album When Your Heart Stops Beating, 2006
"The Truth (Interlude)", a song by Pitbull on his album The Boatlift, 2007
"You Wish (Interlude)", an instrumental song by Breathe Carolina on the album It's Classy, Not Classic, 2008
a song by I Set My Friends on Fire on the album You Can't Spell Slaughter Without Laughter, 2008
a song by Attack Attack! on the album Someday Came Suddenly, 2008
a song by The Decemberists on the album The Hazards of Love, 2009
a song by Lil Wayne on the album Tha Carter IV, 2011
a song by Flobots on the album The Circle in the Square, 2012
a song by G-Eazy on the album These Things Happen, 2014
"Burnt Norton - Interlude" by Lana Del Rey on the album Honeymoon, 2015
a song by Eden on the album End Credits, 2015
"sdp interlude", a song by Travis Scott on the album Birds in the Trap Sing McKnight, 2016
"Stargirl Interlude" by The Weeknd ft. Lana Del Rey on the album Starboy (album), 2016
a song by Lil Peep on the album/mixtape Hellboy, 2017
an instrumental by Alan Walker on the album Different World, 2018
a song by Labi Siffre on the album The Singer and the Song, 1971
"Repeat After Me (Interlude)", a song by The Weeknd on the album After Hours, 2020
"Interlude - The Trio" by Lana Del Rey on the album Blue Banisters, 2021
a song by Madison Beer on the album Life Support, 2021
"Interlude" (J. Cole song), 2021
"someone like u (interlude)", a song by Ariana Grande on the album Positions (Deluxe), 2021
"YUKON (INTERLUDE)", a song by Joji on the album Smithereens (album), 2022

Films
Interlude (1946 film), Swedish film directed by Hasse Ekman and starring Viveca Lindfors and Erik Berglund
Interlude (1957 film) an American film directed by Douglas Sirk and starring June Allyson and Rossano Brazzi
Interlude (1968 film), a British film directed by Kevin Billington and starring Oskar Werner and Barbara Ferris

Other uses
Morality play, a modern critical term describing medieval and early Tudor theatrical entertainments that were known as "Interludes"
Interlude (visual novel), a 2003 anime and visual novel by Longshot
Interlude, an interactive media production company, now known as Eko

See also

 
 Lude (disambiguation)
 Inter (disambiguation)